Alireza Nejati (born 12 November 1998) is an Iranian Greco-Roman wrestler, born in Qom. He represented Iran at the 2020 Summer Olympics in Tokyo, Japan, competing in the Men's Greco-Roman 60 kg event.

References

External links 
 

 

1998 births
Living people
People from Qom
Iranian male sport wrestlers
World Wrestling Championships medalists
Olympic wrestlers of Iran
Wrestlers at the 2020 Summer Olympics
20th-century Iranian people
21st-century Iranian people